Paris By Night 99 – Tôi Là Người Việt Nam (I Am Vietnamese) is a Paris By Night program produced by Thúy Nga Productions that was filmed at Knott's Berry Farm on 16 and 17 January 2010 and released DVD from 8 April 2010. The show was hosted by Nguyễn Ngọc Ngạn, Nguyễn Cao Kỳ Duyên and Trịnh Hội.

This is a musical variety show to introduce and honour the successful Vietnamese people living in many places around the world. All the songs in the show have been composed after 1975 except for the first one (Tình ca).

Performances

Disc 1
01.  Video clip: Tôi Là Người Việt Nam / I am Vietnamese

02.  Tình Ca (Phạm Duy) – Như Quỳnh, Mai Thiên Vân, Ngọc Anh, Nguyệt Anh, Thế Sơn, Trần Thái Hòa, Quang Lê, Trịnh Lam, Hương Giang, Hương Thủy, Quỳnh Vi, Hồ Lệ Thu

03.  Dân Biểu Quốc hội Liên Bang Hoa Kỳ: Luật sư Cao Quang Ánh

04.  Lời Ngỏ – Nguyễn Ngọc Ngạn & Nguyễn Cao Kỳ Duyên

05.  Nhạt Nhòa (Tuấn Khanh) – Ý Lan

06.  Quê Mẹ (Thu Hồ) – Mai Thiên Vân

07.  Video clip: Chinh Chu – Senior Managing Director, The Blackstone Group

08.  Phỏng vấn Chính dien vien hong  Chu

09.  Liên Khúc:
Mời Anh Về Thăm Quê Em (Thùy Linh)
Sóc Sờ Bai Sóc Trăng (Thanh Sơn)
– Hà Phương & Hương Thủy

10.  Video clip: Nguyễn Thị Bích Yến – Vice President SoiTec

11.  Phỏng vấn Nguyễn Thị Bích Yến

12.  Liên Khúc:
Tình Đã Vụt Bay (Vũ Tuấn Đức)
Nhớ (Trịnh Nam Sơn)
– Kỳ Phương Uyên & Lưu Bích

13.  Video clip: Vu Sư Mixed Martial Arts / Mixed martial artist  Cung Le

14.  Phỏng vấn Cung Le

15.  Ở Đâu Cũng Có Em (Trần Quảng Nam) – Trần Thái Hòa

16.  Liên Khúc:
Để Quên Con Tim (Đức Huy)
Và Tôi Cũng Yêu Em (Đức Huy)
– Lương Tùng Quang & Mai Tiến Dũng

17.  Video clip:  Biên Đạo Múa Ballet / Ballet-Choreographer Thắng Đào

18.  Phỏng vấn Thắng Đào

19.  Ướt Mi (Trịnh Công Sơn) – Khánh Ly

20.  Liên Khúc:
Dấu Chân Tình Ái (Ngọc Trọng)
Tóc Ngang Bờ Vai (Vũ Tuấn Đức)
– Như Loan & Nguyễn Thắng

21.  Video clip: Công Ty BTL Machine

22.  Phỏng vấn Võ Bửu – CEO Công Ty BTL Machine

23.  Tình Cha (Ngọc Sơn) – Thành An

24.  Đổi Cả Thiên Thu Tiếng Mẹ Cười (Nhạc: Võ Tá Hân, thơ: Trần Trung Đạo) – Thế Sơn

25.  Video clip: Phi Hành Gia NASA / Scientists, astronauts NASA Dr. Eugene Trịnh Hữu Châu

26.  Tình Đẹp Hậu Giang (Trần Thiện Thanh) – Phi Nhung & Duy Trường

27.  Kỷ Niệm (Phạm Duy) – Dương Triệu Vũ

28.  Phỏng vấn Duy-Loan Le – Founder & Advisor, Sunflower Mission

29.  Video clip: Hội Văn Hóa Khoa Học Kỹ Thuật/Phỏng Vấn Ông Nguyễn Ngọc Bảo – Founder & Advisor VCSA

30.  Video clip: Ph.D. Professor of Astronomy Trịnh Xuân Thuận

31.  Video clip: Canada/Phỏng vấn Đức Giám Mục Vincent Nguyễn Mạnh Hiếu

Disc 2
01. Giới thiệu sách "Kỷ Niệm Sân Khấu"

02. Hài Kịch: Thiên Đàng Không Phải Là Đây (Nguyễn Ngọc Ngạn) – Thúy Nga, Chí Tài, Bé Tí, Hương Thủy

03. Video Clip: Cuisine

04. Phỏng vấn Lê Chí Huy – Nhà Hàng Indochine

05. Câu Kinh Tình Yêu (Sỹ Đan) – Don Hồ

06. Video Clip: Lawyer Viet Dinh – Assistant Attorney General of the United States (2001–03), Professor of Law, Georgetown University

07. Phỏng vấn Viet Dinh

08. Tim Em Mãi Thuộc Về Anh (Đồng Sơn) – Minh Tuyết

09. Video Clip: Úc Châu

10. Tháng 6 Trời Mưa (Nhạc: Hoàng Thanh Tâm, thơ: Nguyên Sa) – Ngọc Anh

11. Tôi Muốn Nói Yêu Em (Mai Anh Việt) – Nguyễn Hưng

12. Video Clip: Mike Nguyễn – Animator/Producer

13. Duyên Phận (Thái Thịnh) – Như Quỳnh

14. Quê Hương Tuổi Thơ Tôi (Từ Huy) – Ngọc Hạ

15. Video Clip: Fashion Designers

16. Phỏng vấn: Calvin Trần, Thiện Lê, Kim Phan

17. Liên Khúc Quốc Hùng (Cơn Mưa Chiều Nay, Lung Linh Giọt Mưa, Vu Vơ Tình Đầu) – Tú Quyên, Quỳnh Vi, Lam Anh

18. Người Em Vỹ Dạ (Minh Kỳ, Tôn Nữ Thụy Khương) – Quang Lê

19. Video Clip: Quý Tôn – CEO Regal Nails

20. Phỏng vấn Quý Tôn

21. Xin Đừng Quay Lại (Diệu Hương) – Bằng Kiều

22. Liên Khúc:
Cứ Lừa Dối Đi (Huỳnh Nhật Tân)
Biển Chiều (Trịnh Lam)
– Hồ Lệ Thu & Trịnh Lam

23. Video Clip: Daniel Phú Dinh – Eyelash extension expert

24. Phỏng vấn Daniel Phú Đinh

25. Em Trong Mắt Tôi (Nguyễn Đức Cường) – Tóc Tiên

26. Quê Hương Mình (Hoài An) – Nguyệt Anh & Hương Giang

27. Finale

Sources 
Paris By Night 99 DVDs.
 Thúy Nga Paris và ‘Tôi là người Việt Nam’, Báo Người Việt, 19/1/2010
 Đi xem PBN 99 “Tôi Là Người Việt Nam”

Paris by Night

vi:Paris By Night 99